The Almighty Insane Popes Nation is a Chicago, Illinois street gang, formed in the late 1950s on the north side of Chicago, primarily building membership from a Greek greaser gang that hung out at the corner of Lawrence and Rockwell. This small group had problems with the much larger Latin Kings gang on the north side, and so they began to associate with the Almighty Simon City Royals in an attempt to protect themselves. However, rather than joining the Royals outright, they eventually decided to form their own gang, which they named the Popes: this stood for "Protecting Our People Eliminating Spics" (eventually the racial slur would be replaced by "scum" when the Popes ceased to be a racist gang and began inviting Latinos and African Americans to join).

Expansion
By the mid 1970s the Popes' main membership consisted of many Poles from the Albany Park/Lincoln Square neighborhood, and German, Irish, and Scandinavians in the Portage Park, Jefferson Park, and Mayfair neighborhoods.  At their peak in the mid-1960s to early 1970s, they had 300–500 members. In the 1980s, news reports indicated that some members were the children of Chicago Fire Department firefighters and Chicago Police Department officers.

South Side Almighty Insane Popes

In the mid 1970s, some accounts claim the nation leader, Larry "Larkin" Morris, started a new branch on the south side. In 1975, Larkin was killed by members of the Almighty Gaylords. The north side Insane Popes formed even stronger alliance with the Simon City Royals, and called this “DAB”. The Royals joined the Folks Nation, and the Almighty Insane Popes Nation eventually did also. However, the south side branch, who hated the Satan Disciples and Two-Six gangs who were Folks Nation members, became a renegade faction, even going so far as to join the rival People Nation alliance and severing ties completely with the north side Almighty Insane Popes Nation.

Modern day
Today the North Side Popes' main rivals are the Latin Kings, and the South Side Popes' main rivals are the Spanish Cobras, Satan Disciples, and Gangster Two-Six. As of 2022, the North Side Popes have territory in Budlong Woods and North Park, while the South Side Popes have active territory in McKinley Park, Vittum Park, and Mt. Greenwood. 

The North Side Popes remain allied with the Folk Nation, while the south side Popes remain allied with the People Nation. South Side Popes wear Chicago White Sox apparel or black and white and Pittsburgh pirates hats. North Side Popes wear baby-blue and black, showing allegiance to the Royals with whom they retain close ties.

See also
Simon City Royals
Almighty Gaylords
Folk Nation
People Nation

References

External links
Insane Popes - Larkin
Pope Gaylord War Perspectives
Insane Pope info at Chicago Mobs.org
South Side Insane Popes Stone Greasers

Organizations established in the 1950s
1950s establishments in Illinois
Folk Nation
Street gangs
European-American gangs
Gangs in Chicago
European-American culture in Chicago